In precolonial Ghana, infectious diseases were the main cause of morbidity and mortality. The modern history of health in Ghana was heavily influenced by international actors such as Christian missionaries, European colonists, the World Bank, and the International Monetary Fund. In addition, the democratic shift in Ghana spurred healthcare reforms in an attempt to address the presence of infectious and noncommunicable diseases eventually resulting in the formation of the National Health insurance Scheme in place today.

The Human Rights Measurement Initiative finds that Ghana is fulfilling 67.1% of what it should be fulfilling for the right to health based on its level of income. When looking at the right to health with respect to children, Ghana achieves 89.3% of what is expected based on its current income. In regards to the right to health amongst the adult population, the country achieves only 78.0% of what is expected based on the nation's level of income.  Ghana falls into the "very bad" category when evaluating the right to reproductive health because the nation is fulfilling only 34.1% of what the nation is expected to achieve based on the resources (income) it has available.

The Colonial Period 
In 1874 Ghana was officially proclaimed a British colony. Ghana proved to be an extremely dangerous disease environment for European colonists, driving the British Colonial Administration to establish a Medical Department, bringing about an introduction to a formal medical system. This consisted of a Laboratory Branch for research, a Medical Branch of hospitals and clinics, and the Sanitary Branch for public health centered near British posts and towns.

In addition to hospitals and clinics staffed with British medical professionals, these select towns were also provided anti-malaria medication to be distributed to colonists and to sell to local Ghanaians. In 1878, the Towns, Police, and Public Health Ordinance was enforced, initiating the construction and demolishing of infrastructure, draining of the streets, and issuing of fines to those that failed to comply with the heads of the colony. In 1893, a Public Works Department was introduced to implement a working sanitation system in urban colonial centers.

After World War II it became increasingly clear that with improved transportation worldwide, international health policy needed to be strengthened. Organizations such as the World Health Organization and the United Nations Children's Fund were active in providing money and support to provide additional western medical care in Ghana. These organizations provided, "financial and technical assistance for the elimination of diseases and the improvement of health standards." Traditional health practices were not recognized by these initiatives or the British Medical Department in urban areas and were shunned by Christian missionaries in rural areas. However, traditional priests, clerics, and herbalists still remained important health providers especially in rural areas where health centers were scarce.

The Nationalist Period 

Ghana gained her independence in 1957 and held its first multiparty elections as a republic in 1960, electing Kwame Nkrumah of the Convention People's Party as Ghana's first President. During the period, the government encouraged socioeconomic development by improving citizens' welfare, including increasing their access to healthcare. As part of these reforms, the private medical industry expanded and healthcare was made free for most citizens.

During the Colonial and early post-Independence periods, most healthcare was focused on the control of epidemics and the treatment of infectious diseases. In cities like Accra, the rate of chronic diseases increased in middle- and high-income groups due to urbanization, globalization, and Nkrumah's focus on infectious disease.

Ghana's health programs were financed entirely through general taxation, but with free public healthcare and large government spending, Ghana found herself struggling economically.

The Fourth Republic 
In the early 1990s, a democratic movement resurfaced and began to sweep through Africa. In response to democratic demands, the Rawlings regime transitioned to create a political party, the National Democratic Congress (NDC), legalized political parties, and organized Presidential and Parliamentary elections in 1992 during which Rawlings won with 58.3 percent of the vote. The new democratic constitution under Rawlings included provisions to better social policies such as education and healthcare in the midst of the rising HIV/AIDS epidemic. In 1996, a Medium Term Health Strategy was adopted that signified a shift from time-restricted, rigid projects to a more holistic approach that would better help develop the public health sector.

In 2015, life expectancy at birth was 66.18 years with males at 63.76 years and females at 68.66 years.  Infant mortality is at 37.37 per 1000 live births. The total fertility rate is 4.06 children per woman among the 15 million Ghanaian nationals. In 2010, there were about 15 physicians and 93 nurses per 100,000 persons.

Disease

According to the World Health Organization, the most common diseases in Ghana include those endemic to sub-Saharan African countries, particularly: cholera, typhoid, pulmonary tuberculosis, anthrax, pertussis, tetanus, chicken pox, yellow fever, measles, infectious hepatitis, trachoma, malaria, HIV and schistosomiasis. Though not as common, other regularly treated diseases include dracunculiasis, dysentery, river blindness or onchocerciasis, several kinds of pneumonia, dehydration, venereal diseases, and poliomyelitis.

In 1994, the WHO reported malaria and measles were the most common causes of premature death. In 1994, 70 percent of deaths in children under five were caused by an infection compounded by malnutrition.  A 2011 report by the Ghana Health Service said that malaria was the primary cause of morbidity and about 32.5 percent of people admitted to Ghanaian medical facilities were admitted because of malaria.

The most recent report from the WHO in 2012 identifies the top causes of death in Ghana as lower respiratory infections (11%), Stroke (9%), Malaria (8%), ischemic heart disease (6%), HIV/AIDS (5%), preterm birth complications (4%), birth asphyxia and birth trauma (4%), meningitis (3%), and protein-energy malnutrition (3%). The life expectancy for women is 63 years while for men, it is 60 years. The infant mortality rate is 41 out of every 1000 live births.

Malaria 

According to the Centers for Disease Control and Prevention, malaria was the third leading cause of death and accounted for 8% of all deaths in Ghana in 2012 despite the fact that malaria is preventable and curable. Malaria occurs every year and affects people of all ages and demographics with women and children under 5 being the most vulnerable groups. In addition, poor communities disproportionately are affected by infectious diseases when compared to wealthy communities due to lack of access to mosquito nets, adequate healthcare, and anti-malaria medication. According to the 2014 Ghana Demographic and Health Survey, the prevalence of malaria in children ages 6 months to 5 years is 36%.

The CDC, Ministry of Health, and Ghana Health Services collaborate to develop and implement malaria control initiatives such as insecticide treated mosquito nets,  indoor residual spraying, improving diagnostics, research, and case management. Insecticide treated mosquito nets have been identified as a cost-effective and sustainable public health method to combat malarial infections. The Ministry of Health and the Ghana Health Service mass distribute the nets free of charge at schools and clinics. At least one Insecticide-treated mosquito net is owned by 68% of all households in Ghana; however, the Ghana Health and Demographic Survey recognise large gaps between insecticide treated mosquito net ownership and use meaning that many with access to the nets are not effectively using them.

HIV/AIDS

Like other countries worldwide, HIV/AIDS is present in Ghana. In 2014, the estimated people that had HIV were 290,000 people out of Ghana's entire population of 27,499,924. In 2014, 2.0% of Ghanaian adults ages 15–49 were HIV positive and less than 1% of people ages 15–24 were HIV positive. HIV is higher in urban areas than in rural areas with prevalences rates of 2.4% and 1.7% respectively. Although  70% of women and 82% of men have knowledge and use of HIV awareness and prevention methods,  HIV/AIDS remains a large common health problem as many individuals do not consistently use a condom, have multiple partners, and fail to get HIV/AIDS testing.

In response to the HIV epidemic in the country, the Government of Ghana established the Ghana AIDS Commission, which coordinates efforts amongst international organizations and other parties to support education about eradication of HIV/AIDS throughout Ghana by the year 2022. The CDC, alongside Ghana's Ministry of Health and Ghana Health Services, is also active in combating HIV/AIDS through improving Ghana's HIV/AIDS data collection and analysis methods in an effort to effectively allocate resources specific to each community's need.

Chronic Diseases 

Though largely ignored by healthcare, public health, and governmental policies, chronic disease prevalence and mortality rates have increased in the present day. Epidemiologists have seen an overall rise in mortality rates caused by chronic diseases compared to pre-independence data that attributed most causes of death to infectious diseases across communities and economic strata. This shift in causes of death from mostly chronic diseases and among wealthy urban populations to a mixture of chronic and communicable diseases in poorer populations reflects increasing life expectancy rates and differences in access to healthcare among differing communities. Chronic diseases receive less attention as a major public health crisis when compared to infectious diseases due Ghana's healthcare system historically and currently placing priority on combating infectious diseases compounded by inadequate financial and human resources.

Chronic diseases have a long history in Africa with early records describing liver cancer in 1817, sickle cell disease in 1866, stroke in the 1920s and studies conducted since the 1950s containing prevalence rates and other important statistics for hypertension, diabetes, cancers, and sickle cell disease. Previously the seventh cause of death in 1953, cardiovascular disease became the number one cause of death in 2001. By 2003 four chronic diseases, stroke, hypertension, diabetes and cancer, had become among the top ten causes of death in Ghana. According to Ghana's 2014 Demographics and Health Survey, 40% of men and 25% of women are overweight with previous data showing a 10% prevalence rate in women in 1993. Hypertension had a national prevalence rate of 28.7% in 2006.

Cancer

Women's health

The health of women in Ghana is critical for national development. Women's health issues in the country are largely centered on nutrition, reproductive health and family planning. Reproduction is the source of many health problems for women in Ghana. The Ghana Living Standards Survey Report of the Fifth Round revealed that about 96.4% of women reported that they, or their partners, were using modern forms of contraception.

This statistic has significant importance in reducing the spread of HIV/AIDS, which affected 120,000 women in Ghana in 2012 (of the 200,000 people living with the disease in Ghana in 2012). Interventions for improving the health of women in Ghana, such as the Ghana Reproductive Health Strategic Plan 2007–2011, focus on maternal morbidity and mortality, contraceptive use and family planning services, and total empowerment of women.

Water supply and sanitation

Since 1994, the water supply and sanitation sector has been gradually modernized through the creation of an autonomous regulatory agency, introduction of private sector participation, and decentralization of the rural supply to 138 districts, where user participation is encouraged. The reforms aim at increasing cost recovery and a modernization of the urban utility Ghana Water Company Ltd. (GWCL), as well as of rural water supply systems. The National Water Policy (NWP), launched at the beginning of 2008, seeks to introduce a comprehensive sector policy.

Water resources
Ghana is well endowed with water resources. The Volta River system basin, consisting of the Oti River, Daka River, Pru River, Sene River and Afram River as well as the White Volta and Black Volta rivers, covers 70% of Ghana's total land area. Another 22% of Ghana is covered by the southwestern river system watershed comprising the Bia River, Tano River, Ankobra River and Pra River. The coastal river system watershed, comprising the Ochi-Nawuka River, Ochi-Amissah River, Ayensu River, Densu River and Tordzie River, covers the remaining 8% of Ghana.

Furthermore, groundwater in Ghana is available in mesozoic and cenozoic sedimentary rocks and in sedimentary formations underlying the Volta Basin. Lake Volta, with a surface of 8,500 km2, is the Earth's largest artificial lake. In all, the total actual renewable water resources are estimated to be 53.2 billion m³ per year.

See also
Healthcare in Ghana
Prayer camps, Ghana
Volunteer Partnerships for West Africa
Accra Declaration
Disability in Ghana
COVID-19 pandemic in Ghana

References